= Bhoganur =

- Village
- Country: India
- State: Karnataka
- District: Dharwad

Government
  - Type: Panchayat raj
  - Body: Gram panchayat

Population (2011)
  - Total: 1,159

Languages
  - Official: Kannada
- Time zone: UTC+5:30 (IST)
- ISO 3166 code: IN-KA
- Vehicle registration: KA
- Website: karnataka.gov.in

Bhoganur is a village in Dharwad district of Karnataka, India.

== Demographics ==
As of the 2011 Census of India there were 228 households in Bhoganur and a total population of 1,159 consisting of 612 males and 547 females. There were 125 children ages 0–6.
